is a Japanese genealogical text. Originally written by Tōin Kinsada in the late 14th century, it was either 15 or 16 volumes in length. This was followed by re-edited editions eventually bringing the text to thirty volumes in length. The full title is 新編纂圖本朝尊卑分脈系譜雜類要集, and it is an old Japanese book that is a collection of genealogies of noble people. The book is considered one of primary sources for the study of genealogies of nobility in Japan, in particular for nobles of Heian and Kamakura periods. Not every part of the book survived, but those that survived tend to be detailed about members of Fujiwara clan and Minamoto clan. Like other major genealogies books, the real names of women (e.g., Murasaki Shikibu), except for very few, were not mentioned in the book.

Its contents include genealogies for the following families:
 Abe
 Fujiwara
 Kamo clan
 Ki
 Minamoto
 Mononobe
 Nakatomi
 Ōe
 Ono
 Ozuki
 Sakanoue
 Soga
 Sugawara
 Tachibana
 Taira
 Tajihi
 Tanba
 Wake

Late Middle Japanese texts